Roberto Carlos Tristán Jorges (born 6 May 1983) is a Peruvian football manager and former player who played as a defender. He is the current manager of Deportivo Garcilaso.

Playing career
Born in Chincha Alta, Tristán never played in any higher than Segunda División during his career. He represented Sport Águila, Sport Huamanga, León de Huánuco, Defensor San José, Universidad Ucayali, Alianza Universidad and Sport Victoria, winning the Copa Perú with León in 2009.

Managerial career
After being an assistant of Mifflin Bermúdez at Sport La Vid in 2015, Tristán was named manager of Sport Huancayo's reserve team Sport Manchete for the 2016 season. In 2017, he returned to Sport La Vid.

On 21 March 2018, Tristán was named in charge of ADT. On 10 May, he replaced Bermúdez at the helm of León de Huánuco, before taking over Deportivo Llacuabamba for the 2019 campaign.

Tristán left Llacuabamba on 5 December 2019, after winning the Copa Perú. He returned to ADT the following 13 January, before returning to León on 12 August 2021.

On 6 September 2021, Tristán was appointed Deportivo Verdecocha manager. He started the 2022 season in charge of Inkas FC, being knocked out in the semifinals of the provincial leagues by Deportivo Garcilaso after fielding an ineligible player; on 6 July of that year, he took over Garcilaso.

Honours

Player
León de Huánuco
Copa Perú: 2009

Manager
Deportivo Llacuabamba
Copa Perú: 2019

Deportivo Garcilaso
Copa Perú: 2022

References

External links

1983 births
Living people
Peruvian footballers
Association football defenders
León de Huánuco footballers
Alianza Universidad footballers
Sport Victoria players
Peruvian football managers
Asociación Deportiva Tarma managers
León de Huánuco managers
Deportivo Garcilaso managers